Maureen Gaynor is a paralympic athlete from the United States competing mainly in category C1 events.

Gaynor competed in two events in the 1984 Summer Paralympics in athletics. She won gold medals in both.

References

External links 
 

Paralympic track and field athletes of the United States
Athletes (track and field) at the 1984 Summer Paralympics
Paralympic gold medalists for the United States
Living people
Year of birth missing (living people)
Medalists at the 1984 Summer Paralympics
Paralympic medalists in athletics (track and field)
20th-century American people